Neyyattinkara Taluk is a Taluk (tehsil) in Thiruvananthapuram district in the Indian state of Kerala. It situated in the Southern part of the Thiruvananthapuram district.  It comprises 21 villages and one municipality. It is the southernmost taluk in the state.

Settlements
There are 21 villages and one Municipality in the taluk.

Villages
Anavoor, Athiyannur, Balaramapuram, Chenkal, Kanjiramkulam, Karode, Karumkulam, Kollayil, Kottukal, Kulathoor, Kunnathukal, Neyyattinkara, Pallichal, Parassala, Parasuvaikkal, Perumkadavila, Perumpazhuthoor, Poovar, Thirupuram, Vellarada, Vizhinjam.

Municipalities
There is only one municipality, Neyyattinkara, which is also the headquarters of the taluk.

References

Geography of Thiruvananthapuram district
Taluks of Kerala